Josue Larose is an American political organizer from Deerfield Beach, Florida. He has formed over 41 political parties, at least 250 Super PACs, and at least 340 state political action committees.

In 2010, he unsuccessfully ran in the gubernatorial election in Florida, receiving 121 votes. Larose is under investigation for over 2,000 counts of breaking election laws. On May 3, 2012, he was featured on a segment of The Colbert Report.

On December 12, 2008, Larose filed with the Federal Election Commission to run for President of the United States as a Republican in the 2016 presidential election, only to withdraw a month later.

In 2020, Larose filed for candidacy in the 2022 U.S. Senate election in Florida, this time as a Democrat.

References

External links 
 Josue Larose at Ballotpedia

Living people
People from Deerfield Beach, Florida
Year of birth uncertain
Date of birth missing (living people)
American political activists
Candidates in the 2016 United States presidential election
Year of birth missing (living people)